is a Japanese manga artist whose stories have frequently been published in the monthly Betsucomi magazine.  Her most current work is Queen's Quality.

Though Motomi uses a male pseudonym and draws herself as a man, she is actually female, as pictured in the May 2010 issue of Betsucomi.

"If my stories can touch you, make you laugh, forget unhappy things, or even give you that 'good job' feeling, then I'll be super, super happy!" - Kyousuke Motomi

List of works

References

External links

Betsucomi Official Site 

Manga artists
Living people
Year of birth missing (living people)